Walter H. Hunt (born 1959) is a science fiction novelist from Massachusetts, United States.

Career
Walter Hunt wrote a number of role-playing game books, including MechWarrior (1986) for FASA.

His writings currently include the Dark Wing series, a military science fiction space opera, as well as numerous role-playing scenarios for various gaming companies.  He is a graduate of Bowdoin College and an alumnus of Alpha Rho Upsilon fraternity at Bowdoin.

Hunt's work experience has been as a software engineer and technical writer. He also has a deep interest in history (which he studied at college), in science fiction, which he has been reading since he watched Neil Armstrong walk on the moon, and in baseball.  His most recent book, A Song in Stone, explores the mystery of Rosslyn Chapel and the fall of the Templars.

He has also been a frequent contributor to Eric Flint's 1632-verse, most notably the 2015 novel 1636: The Cardinal Virtues which he co-wrote with Flint.

Hunt is a Freemason. He lives in eastern Massachusetts with his wife and daughter.

Publications

Dark Wing series
 2001: 
 2003: 
 2004: 
 2005:

1632 series
 2015: 
 2020:

Arcane America series
 2019:

Other works
 2008: 
 2018: 
 2018: 
 2019:

References

External links
 
 Walter Hunt at Fantastic Fiction
 

1959 births
Living people
21st-century American novelists
American male novelists
American science fiction writers
Novelists from Massachusetts
Bowdoin College alumni
American male short story writers
21st-century American short story writers
21st-century American male writers